Jean Chasson (4 March 1906 – 11 November 1993) was a French wrestler. He competed at the 1932 Summer Olympics and the 1936 Summer Olympics.

References

External links
 

1906 births
1993 deaths
French male sport wrestlers
Olympic wrestlers of France
Wrestlers at the 1932 Summer Olympics
Wrestlers at the 1936 Summer Olympics
Sportspeople from Saint-Cloud